Gregory Senat (born September 8, 1994) is an American football offensive tackle for the New York Jets of the National Football League (NFL). He played college football at Wagner.

Early years
Senat attended Elmont Memorial High School, where his main sport was basketball. He played his last two years on the JV football team as a tight end. He also practiced lacrosse from 7 to 10th grade.

After his junior year, he enrolled at Marianapolis Preparatory School in the NEPSAC conference to receive more exposure from college recruiters and focus on his first love basketball.

College career
Senat accepted a basketball scholarship from Wagner College. He played as a power forward for 4 seasons. As a senior in 2016, he contributed to the team winning the Northeast Conference regular season basketball championship, having a 23-11 record and the school's first-ever postseason victory, in the first round of the National Invitation Tournament against St. Bonaventure University.

As a senior in 2016, he joined the football team. His size and athletic ability at the Football Championship Subdivision level, allowed him to start all 22 games at right tackle in two seasons. He participated in the East-West Shrine All-Star Football Game, becoming the first player from a Northeast Conference school to do so.

Professional career

Baltimore Ravens
Senat was selected by the Baltimore Ravens in the sixth round (212th overall) of the 2018 NFL Draft. He was placed on injured reserve on August 31, 2018 after having foot surgery.

On September 14, 2019, Senat was waived by the Ravens.

Kansas City Chiefs
On September 16, 2019, Senat was claimed off waivers by the Kansas City Chiefs. The Chiefs placed him on injured reserve on November 2, 2019. That season, the Chiefs went on to win Super Bowl LIV. He was waived on September 5, 2020.

Cleveland Browns
Senat was signed to the Cleveland Browns' practice squad on September 8, 2020.

Dallas Cowboys
On October 6, 2020, Senat was signed by the Dallas Cowboys off the Browns practice squad. He appeared in 10 games, playing on the special teams units.

Cleveland Browns (second stint)
On March 19, 2021, Senat signed with the Cleveland Browns on a one-year deal. He was placed on injured reserve on August 31, 2021 with a knee injury. He was waived off the injured reserve list on September 9, 2021.

Indianapolis Colts
On October 12, 2021, Senat was signed to the Indianapolis Colts practice squad. He was promoted to the active roster on December 28, but was waived four days later.

New York Jets
On January 3, 2022, Senat was claimed off waivers by the New York Jets. On April 5, 2022, Senat re-signed with the Jets.

He was placed on the reserve/non-football injury list on July 21, 2022, ending his season.

Personal life
Senat is of Haitian descent. He supports the Hope for Haiti charity.

References

External links
Wagner Seahawks Bio

1994 births
Living people
American football offensive tackles
American men's basketball players
Baltimore Ravens players
Basketball players from New York (state)
Cleveland Browns players
Indianapolis Colts players
Kansas City Chiefs players
New York Jets players
People from Elmont, New York
Players of American football from New York (state)
Sportspeople from Nassau County, New York
Wagner Seahawks football players
Wagner Seahawks men's basketball players
American sportspeople of Haitian descent